Qosa may refer to:
Qoşa, Azerbaijan
Queens of the Stone Age (QOSA), American band